Daniel Peter Rosado (born July 6, 1959) is a former American football center who played for the San Diego Chargers of the National Football League (NFL). He played college football at Northern Illinois University. He also played in the United States Football League (USFL) for the Houston Gamblers and was a member of the Miami Dolphins.

References 

Living people
American football centers
Northern Illinois Huskies football players
1959 births
Players of American football from Oklahoma
San Diego Chargers players